This article describes the main round of the 2016–17 Women's EHF Champions League.

Qualified teams

Format
In each group, teams played against each other in a double round-robin format, with home and away matches against teams they did not met before. Points obtained in the group stage were taken over. After completion of the group stage matches, the top four teams of each group advanced to the quarterfinals.

Groups
The matchdays were 27–29 January, 3–5 February, 10–12 February, 24–26 February, 3–5 March, 10–12 March 2017.

Group 1

Group 2

References

External links
Official website

2016–17 Women's EHF Champions League